Aare Laht (born on 6 June 1948) is an Estonian chemist.

He has worked at National Institute of Chemical Physics and Biophysics

In 1980, he was among the signatories of the Letter of 40 intellectuals.

In 2006, he was awarded with Order of the National Coat of Arms, IV class.

References

Living people
1948 births
Estonian chemists
Recipients of the Order of the National Coat of Arms, 4th Class